Steven Sherburne Hawes (born May 26, 1950) is an American former basketball player.

Hawes played high school basketball at Mercer Island High School.

A 6'9" center from the University of Washington, Hawes played ten seasons (1974–84) in the National Basketball Association as a member of the Houston Rockets, Portland Trail Blazers, Atlanta Hawks, and Seattle SuperSonics.  He scored 5,768 career points and grabbed 4,272 career rebounds.

Hawes was voted on to the Washington's All-Century basketball team which was selected by a fan vote in 2002.

Hawes's nephew, Spencer Hawes, was selected by the Sacramento Kings in the 2007 NBA Draft.

Notes

External links
Player Profile - basketball-reference.com
Player Profile - Legabasket.it

1950 births
Living people
American expatriate basketball people in Italy
American men's basketball players
Atlanta Hawks players
Basketball players from Seattle
Centers (basketball)
Cleveland Cavaliers draft picks
Houston Rockets players
Mercer Island High School alumni
Portland Trail Blazers players
Power forwards (basketball)
Reyer Venezia players
Seattle SuperSonics players
Washington Huskies men's basketball players